Pathrala Barrage (Hindi: पथराला बांध) is a barrage across the Somb river, located in Yamuna Nagar District, in the state of Haryana, India.

History

The Western Yamuna Canal, built in 1335 CE by Firuz Shah Tughlaq, excessive silting caused it to stop flowing in 1750 CE, British raj undertook a three-year renovation in 1817 by Bengal Engineer Group, in 1832-33 Tajewala Barrage dam at Yaumna was built to regulate the flow of water, in 1875-76 Pathrala barrage at Dadupur and Somb river dam downstream of canal were built, in 1889-95 the largest branch of the canal Sirsa branch was constructed, the modern Hathni Kund Barrage was built in 1999 to handle the problem of silting to replace the older Tajewala Barrage.

The canals irrigate vast tracts of land in the region in Ambala district, Karnal district, Sonepat district, Rohtak district, Jind district, Hisar district and  Bhiwani district.

See also

 Blue Bird Lake, Hisar (city)
 Kaushalya Dam in Pinjore 
 Bhakra Dam
 Hathni Kund Barrage
 Okhla Barrage - Western Yamuna Canal begins here 
 Surajkund
 Indira Gandhi Canal
 Irrigation in India 
 Indian Rivers Inter-link
 Inland waterways of India
 Ganges Canal
 Ganges Canal (Rajasthan)
 Upper Ganges Canal Expressway
 List of lakes in India
 List of dams and reservoirs in Haryana

References

External links
 Pollution in Yamuna river

Dams in Haryana
Dams on the Yamuna River
Yamunanagar district
Lakes of Haryana
Irrigation in Haryana
1875 establishments in India
Dams completed in 1875